Yu Bin (Chinese: 喻彬 Yù Bīn, pseudonyms: 如冰 Rú Bīng, 愚公 Yú Gōng) (born 6 November 1966 in Jishui, Jiangxi province) Is a Chinese painter and writer. He now works as a Professor in Guangzhou University, teaching Drama and Film Literature, Drama and Film Appreciation and Criticism, and Screenplay Writing.

Biography
Born in Jishui, Jiangxi province, Yu Bin  graduated from the Chinese Language and Literature Department of Northwest University, China. Now he lives in Guangzhou, works on press and publication as a journalist. He began his writing and painting career in 1986. In 2013, Yu Bin was invited as the Signed Writer of the writers’ association of Guangdong Province. He is now the director of Guangdong Sinology Research Association, the review expert of overseas film and television dramas of Guangdong press, publication, radio, film and television bureau, a member of Chinese Writers Association, Guangdong Dramatists Association, Chinese Film Literature Association, Aesthetic education expert database of Guangdong Provincial Department of Education, and Chinese Biographical Literature Association. He is also a signed writer of Guangdong (China) Writers Association.

Works
Yu Bin's works published in art and literature journals like China Art Weekly, Art Observation, Pathlight (People’s Literature), Chinese Writer, Huacheng and Fiction World. Major works are Women in War, Miserable World—Tears of Blood, Footprints of Years, Ms. Bodyguard of Sun Yat-sen, Dance with the Devil,The Legend of the Sixth Patriarch of Zen Sect,Looking for Father, etc.

In November 2011, he published the Legend of the Sixth Patriarch of Zen Sect (coauthored). In December 2011, he published two novels, Women in War and Miserable World—Tears of Blood. In 2013, Yu Bin was invited as the Signed Writer of the writers’ association of Guangdong Province. In 2016, he published Ms. Bodyguard of Sun Yat-sen (novel). In 2017, he published New Media Writing and Ironclad Proof(a collection of his screenplays).

He is prolific a film director. His main works include Ms. Bodyguard of Sun Yat-sen, Karma of Green Plum, The Legend of Liu Heizai, and A Bold Team Named Dongzhong, etc.

Novel: Dance with the Devil, Ms. Bodyguard of Sun Yat-sen, Prediction
Full-length Biographical Literature: The Legend of the Sixth Patriarch of Zen Sect (coauthored)
Novelette Anthology: Women in War
Documentary Literature Anthology: Miserable World—Tears of Blood
Reportage Literature Anthology: The Force
Painting and Poetry Anthology: Footprints of Years
Teaching Material: New Media Writing
Painting Collection: Portrait of Dreams
Fiction Collection: Fallen Yellow Flowers
Reportage Collection: Weeping for the People
Film: Seven Fright Nights
Film Script:   The Earth and Jiamu
Documentary:  The Secret of Life

Awards
Oil painting Girl with A petal won the bronze award in 1st International Chinese Realistic Character Oil Painting Competition, another oil painting The Threshold—the Dream won the honorable mention in 2nd International Chinese Realistic Character Oil Painting Competition.

Novella Women in War was award for nomination in 5th (2007–2009) The Lu Xun Prize in Literature, China.

Screenplays Iron Heroine and Narrow Escape are respectively won the Screenplay Award in the 2nd and 3rd Beijing Film Artists Association Cup. Screenplay Escape won the Screenplay Award in 3rd Chongqing Film Artists Association Cup, 2012.

2008, bronze award in 1st International Chinese Realistic Character Oil Painting Competition.
2009, honorable mention in 2nd International Chinese Realistic Character Oil Painting Competition.
2011, Screenplay Award in 2nd Beijing Film Artists Association Cup.
2012, Screenplay Award in 3rd Beijing Film Artists Association Cup.
2012, Screenplay Award in 3rd Chongqing Film Artists Association Cup.
2016, the prize for the best short documentary in the Canada Golden Maple Film Festival.
2020, Chine Golden Rooster Award for National Theme: Creative Script Award.

References
Zhou Hang. Yu Bin’s The Red Wooden Box— A Crueller Slaughter than the War. Journal of Literature and Arts (June 14, 2010). China Writer.com (June 17, 2010) (Simplified Chinese)
Appreciation of Yu Bin’s Oil Paintings, People’s Daily Online (August 2, 2011) (Simplified Chinese)
Guangzhou Writer Yu Bin’s Screenplay Iron Heroine Awarded, Sina.com (Sep. 5th, 2011) (Simplified Chinese)
Qingshan. Yu Bin and His Artistic World in My Eye. Contemporary Fictions (2nd Volume) 2010, 8, CNKI (Aug. 28th, 2010) (Simplified Chinese)
Xinhuanet.com. Revealing of 3rd Beijing Film Artists Association Cup. November 24, 2012 (Simplified Chinese)
Chongqing Daily.com. Revealing of the Screenplay Collection and Selection of 3rd Chongqing Film Artists Association Cup. December 30, 2012 (Simplified Chinese)

1966 births
Painters from Jiangxi
Living people
People from Ji'an
Writers from Jiangxi
Chinese male novelists